This is a list of flags used in Kenya.

National Flag

Military

Historical

Portuguese Rule

Omani Rule

German Wituland

British East Africa Company

British East Africa Protectorate

British Protectorate of Kenya

Italian Occupation

Cities 

Nairobi

Kenya
Flags
Flags